Cercospora odontoglossi is a fungal plant pathogen.

References

odontoglossi
Fungal plant pathogens and diseases